Griffith Park Zoo, referred to today as the Old Los Angeles Zoo, was a city-owned zoo in Los Angeles, California that opened in 1912 and closed in 1966 with the opening of the new Los Angeles Zoo. The abandoned site of the Griffith Park Zoo, complete with the ruins of animal enclosures, is now a picnic area featuring multiple hiking trails in Griffith Park.

History

The first zoo in Los Angeles was the Eastlake Zoo in East Los Angeles, which opened in 1885. The Griffith Park Zoo opened in 1912 with a grand total of 15 animals.  The new zoo was built on the site of Griffith J. Griffith's defunct Ostrich farm.  In the mid 1920s, film producer William Nicholas Selig donated many of the animals from his studios, which he had attempted to convert into an animal theme park, to the new zoo.

It was expanded in the 1930s by work crews from the Works Progress Administration. Most of the enclosures were built in the caves-with-iron-bars style which was then standard for zoos.

As Los Angeles grew, the small Griffith Park Zoo was increasingly criticized as an "inadequate, ugly, poorly designed and under-financed collection of beat-up cages", despite drawing more than 2 million visitors a year. In 1958 the city passed an $8 million bond measure to create a brand new zoo.  Griffith Park Zoo closed in August 1966 and its animals were transferred to the new Los Angeles Zoo 2 miles away, which opened in November 1966. The animal enclosures, with the bars removed, were left as ruins; picnic benches or tables were installed in some of them for park visitors.

References

External links 
Zoo history with photo.
Photos of zoo from USC Digital Library

Former zoos
1912 establishments in California
1966 disestablishments in California
History of Los Angeles
Zoos established in 1912
Zoos disestablished in 1966